Haunted House is a 1940 American mystery film directed by Robert F. McGowan and written by Dorothy Davenport. The film stars Jackie Moran, Marcia Mae Jones, George Cleveland, Christian Rub, Henry Hall and John St. Polis. The film was released on July 23, 1940, by Monogram Pictures.

Plot

Jimmie, the Brownsville Bugle's office boy, and Millie, niece of editor Henshaw, turn amateur detectives in order to help a friend who is accused of murder. With more zeal than direction, they pick the owner of a gas station as the killer, and when he turns out to be innocent, Henshaw fires Jimmie. The two go on searching and next suspect Lawyer Cy Burton but have no conclusive evidence and are about to give up when Millie finds a clue that leads to the hidden fortune of the murdered Mrs. Blake.

Cast          
Jackie Moran as Jimmie Atkins
Marcia Mae Jones as Mildred Henshaw
George Cleveland as Albert Henshaw
Christian Rub as Olaf Jensen
Henry Hall as Cyrus W. 'Cy' Burton
John St. Polis as Simkins
Clarence Wilson as Eph
Mary Carr as Grandma
Jessie Arnold as Mrs. Emily Henshaw
Hooper Atchley as Prosecuting Attorney
Marcelle Ray as Lucy Peters
Buddy Swan as Junior Henshaw

References

External links
 

1940 films
American mystery films
1940 mystery films
Monogram Pictures films
Films directed by Robert F. McGowan
American black-and-white films
1940s English-language films
1940s American films